You Can't Sit With Us is the debut studio album by Chicago hip hop group Pivot Gang. It was self-released on April 19, 2019, available on music digital distribution platforms. The thirteen-track album features guest appearances from Benjamin Earl Turner, Femdot, Jean Deaux, Kari Faux, Mick Jenkins, Smino and Sylvan LaCue.

Singles and promotion
Music videos were released for "Jason Statham, Pt. 2" and "Studio Ground Rules", both directed by Addison Wright. On April 5, the group revealed the album's title, tracklist and artwork, and released the album's third single "Bad Boys" featuring Smino.

Critical reception

Lucy Shanker of Consequence of Sound gave a positive review of the album saying "Over the course of 13 tracks, You Can't Sit with Us flaunts the power of Chicago's Westside. Pivot Gang have no shortage of members or talent, so it seems to almost have been easy for them to create such an exceptional project. It is built up of well-thought-out features and lyrics that are at times witty and others necessarily gruesome. It hosts songs about lust, trauma, and taking care of the ones they care for. The record is a labor of love, and it was also made by completely independent artists, which makes it even more impressive". Editor for HotNewHipHop, Robert Blair, said the album "pays no mind to the pressures of living up to Chicago's rich heritage and instead keeps its sights honed in on a prosperous future. More than an endless stream of punchlines, the record is a thoughtful examination of life's trials and tribulations that's delivered with wry humour, emotion and blistering production".

Accolades

Track listing

See also 
 2019 in hip hop music

References 

2019 debut albums
Saba (rapper) albums
Hip hop albums by American artists